Fallablemma is a genus of araneomorph spiders in the family Tetrablemmidae that was first described by W. A. Shear in 1978.  it contains two species, found on the Polynesian Islands and Sulawesi: F. castaneum and F. greenei.

See also
 List of Tetrablemmidae species

References

Araneomorphae genera
Spiders of Asia
Tetrablemmidae